Sublette County is a county in the U.S. state of Wyoming. As of the 2020 United States Census, the population was 8,728. The county seat is Pinedale. It is a sparsely populated rural county in western Wyoming, along the Green River.

History
Sublette County was created February 15, 1921, of land partitioned from Fremont and Lincoln counties. Its governing organization was completed by 1923. Before settlement, the western Wyoming mountains were traversed and harvested by fur trappers and traders. Sublette County is named for one of those early characters, William Lewis Sublette. Today the county celebrates its fur trade heritage with the Museum of the Mountain Man in Pinedale.  In the early 1900s the majority of the population in what is today Sublette County were first generation immigrants from England and Germany.  A majority of the population in Sublette County supported America's entry into World War I and at the time the county was known for its "pro-British" sentiments. The German immigrants in the county were not anti-British, and most of them were outspoken about England being their favorite foreign country other than Germany, however they did support neutrality and want America to stay out of the war.  Even during the war, relations between first generation English immigrants and first generation German immigrants were known for being exceptionally cordial (Sublette County, Wyoming stood out in this regard because this was not the norm nation-wide).

Geography

Adjacent counties
 Fremont County – east
 Sweetwater County – southeast
 Lincoln County – southwest
 Teton County - northwest

National protected areas
 Bridger National Forest (part)
 Shoshone National Forest (part)
 Teton National Forest (part)
At present, Bridger National Forest and Teton National Forest are administratively combined into the Bridger-Teton National Forest. Sublette County contains portions of both original forests.

Demographics

2000 census
As of the 2000 United States Census there were 5,920 people, 2,371 households, and 1,707 families in the county. Since 2000, however, an oil boom has increased the population significantly. The population density was 1.2 person per square mile (0.5/km2). There were 3,552 housing units at an average density of 0.7 per square mile (0.3/km2). The racial makeup of the county was 97.48% White, 0.20% Black or African American, 0.49% Native American, 0.24% Asian, 0.08% Pacific Islander, 0.52% from other races, and 0.98% from two or more races. 1.89% of the population were Hispanic or Latino of any race. 21.7% were of German, 17.5% English, 11.0% American and 10.1% Irish ancestry.

There were 2,371 households, out of which 32.70% had children under the age of 18 living with them, 63.30% were married couples living together, 5.30% had a female householder with no husband present, and 28.00% were non-families. 23.60% of all households were made up of individuals, and 6.50% had someone living alone who was 65 years of age or older. The average household size was 2.47 and the average family size was 2.91.

The county population contained 25.80% under the age of 18, 6.00% from 18 to 24, 27.50% from 25 to 44, 28.70% from 45 to 64, and 12.00% who were 65 years of age or older. The median age was 40 years. For every 100 females there were 104.30 males. For every 100 females age 18 and over, there were 104.50 males.

The median income for a household in the county was $39,044, and the median income for a family was $45,000. Males had a median income of $35,000 versus $21,109 for females. The per capita income for the county was $20,056. About 7.40% of families and 9.70% of the population were below the poverty line, including 10.40% of those under age 18 and 8.70% of those age 65 or over.

2010 census
As of the 2010 United States Census, there were 10,247 people, 3,906 households, and 2,594 families in the county. The racial makeup of the county was 93.2% white, 0.8% American Indian, 0.5% Asian, 0.3% black or African American, 3.7% from other races, and 1.4% from two or more races. Those of Hispanic or Latino origin made up 6.9% of the population. In terms of ancestry, 31.8% were German, 22.0% were English, 11.3% were Irish, 6.3% were American, and 5.1% were Scottish.

Of the 3,906 households, 32.0% had children under the age of 18 living with them, 56.3% were married couples living together, 5.1% had a female householder with no husband present, 33.6% were non-families, and 25.6% of all households were made up of individuals. The average household size was 2.48 and the average family size was 2.99. The median age was 38.3 years.

The median income for a household in the county was $70,147 and the median income for a family was $81,389. Males had a median income of $51,125 versus $31,940 for females. The per capita income for the county was $31,433. About 2.7% of families and 4.2% of the population were below the poverty line, including 2.2% of those under age 18 and 1.1% of those age 65 or over.

Communities

Towns
 Big Piney
 Marbleton
 Pinedale (county seat)

Census-designated places
 Bondurant
 Boulder
 Cora
 Daniel

Unincorporated community
 Calpet

Government and politics
Like most of Wyoming, Sublette County is overwhelmingly Republican. Since it was created in 1921, the solitary Democrat to carry the county was Franklin D. Roosevelt, who won a majority against Herbert Hoover in 1932 and a twenty-nine vote plurality against Alf Landon four years later. Since 1968 no Democrat has reached twenty-nine percent of Sublette County's ballots, and the only occasions a Republican has failed to pass seventy percent were when Ross Perot took substantial numbers of votes in 1992 and 1996.

Sublette County is managed by a county commission with three members. In 2011, Sublette County residents petitioned voters to approve an increase in this number to five as allowed under Wyoming law. The ballot initiative passed and five commissioners were to be seated during the 2012 election cycle.

In early 2012, another ballot initiative was presented to voters requesting their approval to decrease the number of county commissioners back to three even before seating the two additional commissioners. This second special election, held on May 8, 2012, returned the commission to its previous number of three.

Media references
 In 2007, The New Yorker reported on the rising crime rate, influx of roughnecks and methamphetamine, the decline in ranching, and environmental damage associated with the county's oil boom.
 In 1965, The New Yorker  described a trip along the Green River that set out from the Circle S Ranch in Cora.

See also
 National Register of Historic Places listings in Sublette County, Wyoming
Wyoming
List of cities and towns in Wyoming
List of counties in Wyoming
Wyoming statistical areas

References

External links

 Socioeconomics of Sublette County
 Sublette County Travel Website
 Sublette County Chamber of Commerce
 Sublette County Government
 Pinedale Town Hall
 Big Piney Town Hall
 Area Information

 
1923 establishments in Wyoming
Populated places established in 1923